Toybipet (also, Sibapot and Toibi) is a former Gabrieleño settlement in Los Angeles County, California. It was located at San Jose (Pomona).

References

Former settlements in Los Angeles County, California
Former populated places in California